Charles Henry Kennett Watkins (14 July 1847 – 31 July 1933) was a New Zealand artist who was known for his New Zealand landscape paintings. He also painted scenes from the New Zealand Wars as well as of Maori life and history.

Biography
Charles Henry Kennett Watkins was born in Ootacamund, India to Major John Watkins of the Indian Army. After attending Wellington College and studying in Switzerland and France, Kennett immigrated to New Zealand at the age of twenty-seven where he first found work as a photographer before teaching in Russell. In 1876 he moved to Auckland where he found work as an art teacher, becoming the first and only headmaster of the Auckland Free School of Art.

Personnel Life
On 10 October 1876 Kennett married Clara Eliza Alice Davis at Kerikeri and had four children. Kennett died on 31 July 1933 in Mercury Bay, Waikato and was buried at Whitianga Public Cemetery.

Notable Works

 Waikato River, (oil on canvas, 1881)
 The Haunt of the Moa, a scene in Puriri Forest, (oil on canvas, 1885)
 The Phantom Canoe: A Legend of Lake Tarawera, (oil on canvas, 1888)
 The blowing up of the Boyd, (oil on canvas, 1889)
 Arrival of Captain Cook; An incident in the Bay of Islands, 29 November 1769, (oil on cardboard, 1890)
 The Death of Von Tempsky at Te Ngutu o Te Manu, (oil on canvas, 1893)
 Departure of the six canoes from Raratonga for New Zealand, (oil on canvas, 1906)
 The Legend of the Voyage to New Zealand, (oil on canvas, 1912)

References

1847 births
1933 deaths
New Zealand painters
Artists from Tamil Nadu